Gemäldegalerie (German for picture gallery) may refer to various museums in the German-speaking world:
 Gemäldegalerie in Berlin, Germany
 Gemäldegalerie Alte Meister (picture gallery of the Old Masters) in Dresden, Germany
 Galerie Neue Meister (picture gallery of the New Masters), sometimes known as Gemäldegalerie Neue Meister, in Dresden, Germany
 Anhaltische Gemäldegalerie (picture gallery of Anhalt) in Dessau, Germany
 The first floor of the Kunsthistorisches Museum in Vienna, Austria is called the Gemäldegalerie
 Die Gemäldegalerie at the Academy of Fine Arts in Vienna, Austria